Thomas Joseph Stewart (July 26, 1848 – November 9, 1926) was a Canadian politician.

He was mayor of Hamilton, Ontario from 1907 to 1908. He was a Conservative Member of the House of Commons of Canada for the riding of Hamilton West from 1908 to 1925.

External links
 
 Hamilton Public Library profile
 

1848 births
1926 deaths
Conservative Party of Canada (1867–1942) MPs
Mayors of Hamilton, Ontario
Members of the House of Commons of Canada from Ontario
Unionist Party (Canada) MPs